Natsume (夏目, 夏芽, 棗, なつめ or ナツメ) is a feminine given name and a surname, and may refer to:

People with the given name
, a Japanese light novel author and manga writer
, a Japanese model, singer, and presenter
, a Japanese manga artist
, a Japanese gravure idol

People with the surname
, a Japanese columnist and cartoonist
, a Japanese actor
, a Japanese former adult video (AV) actress
, a Japanese gravure idol
, a Japanese director
, a Japanese actress
, a Japanese novelist of the early years of the 20th century
, Japanese samurai 
, Japanese manga artist
, Japanese footballer

Fictional characters
Atsuko Natsume is the protagonist of the All Purpose Cultural Cat Girl Nuku Nuku
 Natsume, a Pokémon character renamed Sabrina in the English version
 Natsume Hyūga, a character in the anime/manga series Alice Academy
 Natsume Takashi, the title character in the manga and anime series Natsume's Book of Friends
 Maya Natsume, a character in the anime Tenjho Tenge
 Asako Natsume, a character in the manga My Little Monster (Tonari No Kaibutsu-kun)
 Mio Natsume, a character in the Ressha Sentai ToQger
 Natsume, known as "Coco" in English, a character in Fighting Foodons
 Mai Natsume, a character from the BlazBlue series
 Natsume, a character in the anime Deca-Dence

Other uses
/, Japanese name for the Jujube fruit (Ziziphus jujuba)
, a type of chaki (tea caddy) used in Japanese tea ceremony
 Natsume (company), a Japanese video game developer

Japanese feminine given names
Japanese-language surnames